The Minuet (formerly known as the Napoleon) is a hybrid mix of Persian and Munchkin cat breeds.  Categorized by The International Cat Association (TICA) as a domestic hybrid, "developed from a deliberate cross between two existing domestic breeds, incorporating characteristics of both parental breeds into the new mix." According to TICA's official standards, these breeds represent the only permissible outcrosses one may use to create the Minuet.  This includes the combinations Minuet × Minuet, Minuet × Munchkin, and Minuet × one of the Persian-type breeds (including Persians, Himalayans and Exotic Shorthairs). Minuets come in both long-haired and short-haired varieties.

Origin 

The mix was created by Joseph B. Smith, a Basset Hound breeder and American Kennel Club (AKC) judge. He was inspired by the Wall Street Journal's front-page feature of the Munchkin on June 12, 1995. He was a fan of the Munchkin, but felt that the unavoidable long-legged versions were indistinguishable from similar mixed cats, commonly seen in animal shelters. Smith decided that something had to be done to create a cat unique in both short- and long-legged versions, something that looked purebred. He chose the Persian breed group as an outcross to the Munchkin for two reasons: beauty and boning. The original Napoleon standard was written with this in mind.

In January 2015, TICA's board of directors voted to change the name of the mix to the Minuet. The breed is still not recognized by many associations, including Cat Fanciers' Association, American Cat Fanciers Association, or Fédération Internationale Féline.

Description 

The Napoleon inherited its distinctively short legs from the Munchkin, which are caused by a naturally occurring genetic mutation. From the Persian group (including Persians, Exotic Shorthairs and Himalayans) the Minuet has inherited its short snout, round face, dense coat and substantial boning. The boning provides a good support system for its uniquely short legs.

Care

Overall, Minuets have few health problems, but there are specific genetic conditions to look out for as with any species. Because of their Persian lineage, Minuets are prone to polycystic kidney disease (PKD). Breeders regularly screen parent cats for PKD prior to breeding. Other shared problems with the Persian lineage include epiphora (excessive formation of tears) due to nasolacrimal duct obstruction and thick coats prone to matting in absence of regular grooming.

Like Munchkins, Minuets can develop osteoarthritis, but this is much less common than it is in dog breeds that share the dwarfism phenotype (Dachshund and Corgi breeds, for example).

See also

 List of cat breeds
 List of experimental cat breeds
 Munchkin cat
Persian cat
Bambino cat

References

External links
Youtube videos about minuet cats

Cat breeds
Cat breeds and types with short legs